William Ware Peck (February 17, 1821 – July 18, 1897) was an American jurist who served as a justice of the Territorial Wyoming Supreme Court from December 14, 1877, to January 11, 1882.

Born in Burlington, Vermont, he graduated from the University of Vermont in 1841, and received an LL.B. from Harvard University in 1844.

In 1977, Peck was appointed associate justice for the Wyoming Supreme Court by President Rutherford B. Hayes, serving in that capacity from December 14, 1877, to January 11, 1882. Afterwards, "Peck practiced law first in Cheyenne and then in New York City", where he later died.

References

Justices of the Wyoming Supreme Court
1821 births
1897 deaths
People from Burlington, Vermont
University of Vermont alumni
Harvard University alumni
United States Article I federal judges appointed by Rutherford B. Hayes